Major-General William Andrew Evans  (b. August 1939) is a former British Army officer.

Military career
Educated at Sherborne School, Royal Military Academy Sandhurst and Christ Church, Oxford, Evans was commissioned into the 5th Royal Inniskilling Dragoon Guards in 1959. He became commanding officer of the 5th Royal Inniskilling Dragoon Guards in 1980. He went on to be commander of 4th Armoured Brigade in 1983, Assistant Chief of Staff, Operations, British Army of the Rhine in 1987 and General Officer Commanding Eastern District in 1989 before retiring in 1992.

He was appointed a Companion of the Order of the Bath in the 1993 New Year Honours. and was a Deputy Lieutenant of Essex.

References

 

1939 births
Living people
Companions of the Order of the Bath
Deputy Lieutenants of Essex
British Army major generals
5th Royal Inniskilling Dragoon Guards officers